The 1905 Case football team represented the Case School of Applied Science in the American city of Cleveland, Ohio, now a part of Case Western Reserve University, during the 1905 college football season. The team's head coach was Joseph Wentworth.  Case won its fourth consecutive Ohio Athletic Conference title.

Schedule

References

Case
Case Western Reserve Spartans football seasons
Case football